Harald Braner (born 19 August 1943) is a retired German football midfielder and later manager.

References

1943 births
Living people
German footballers
Wormatia Worms players
1. FC Kaiserslautern players
SSV Reutlingen 05 players
VfL Osnabrück players
Association football midfielders
Bundesliga players
German football managers
FC 08 Homburg managers
Wormatia Worms managers
People from Worms, Germany
Footballers from Rhineland-Palatinate